Zarma оr Zerma may refer to:

 Zarma people, an ethnic group of West Africa
 Zarma language, a Songhai language
 Marina Zarma, Cypriot swimmer

See also 
 Djerma (disambiguation)
 Jerma (disambiguation)

Language and nationality disambiguation pages